Ruth Solomon (born April 16, 1941) is an American politician who served in the Arizona House of Representatives from the 14th district from 1989 to 1995 and in the Arizona Senate from the 14th district from 1995 to 2003.

References

1941 births
Living people
Politicians from Philadelphia
Women state legislators in Arizona
Democratic Party members of the Arizona House of Representatives
Democratic Party Arizona state senators